Roll with It is the fifth solo studio album by English blue-eyed soul artist Steve Winwood, released  on 20 June 1988. It became Winwood's most commercially successful album, reaching number four on the UK Albums Chart and number one on the US Billboard 200, and has sold over three million copies.

The title track topped the pop and rock singles charts; its success led to the subsequent singles "Don't You Know What the Night Can Do?" and "Holding On". "Don't You Know What the Night Can Do?" had been written by Winwood to be featured in an ad campaign for Michelob, which began running on American television on the day of the Roll with It album's US release. Two other tracks from Roll with It: "Hearts on Fire" and "Put on Your Dancing Shoes", also achieved radio airplay.

Track listing
All songs written by Steve Winwood and Will Jennings except where noted.
 "Roll with It" (Winwood, Jennings, Holland-Dozier-Holland) – 5:17
 "Holding On" – 6:14
 "The Morning Side" – 5:12
 "Put on Your Dancing Shoes" – 5:10
 "Don't You Know What the Night Can Do?" – 6:53
 "Hearts on Fire" (Winwood, Jim Capaldi) – 5:14
 "One More Morning" – 4:58
 "Shining Song" – 5:29

Personnel 

 Steve Winwood – lead vocals, backing vocals (1, 2, 4-6, 8), acoustic piano (1, 7), Hammond organ (1, 2, 6, 7), Fairlight programming (1, 2, 4-6, 8), bass guitar (1, 7), drums (1), keyboards (2-5, 8), guitar (2, 4, 7), Moog bass (3), Minimoog solo (8)
 Mike Lawler – keyboards (1-8)
 Robbie Kilgore – keyboards (2, 4, 8)
 Paul Pesco – guitar (3, 6)
 John Robinson – drums (2-7)
 Bashiri Johnson – percussion (2-5, 7)
 Jimmy Bralower – percussion (4, 8), drum machine (4, 8)
 Tom Lord-Alge – tambourine (8)
 The Memphis Horns – horn arrangements (1, 2, 6, 7)
 Andrew Love –  tenor saxophone, sax solo (1)
 Wayne Jackson – trombone, trumpet
 Mark Williamson – backing vocals (1, 2, 4-6, 8)
 Tessa Niles – backing vocals (1, 2, 4-6, 8)

Production 
 Steve Winwood – producer
 Tom Lord-Alge – producer, engineer, mixing
 John Clarke – executive producer
 Jeff Lord-Alge – assistant engineer
 Mary Kettle – assistant engineer
 Paul Shubat – assistant engineer
 Ted Jensen – mastering at Sterling Sound (New York, NY).
 Lee Charteris – production  coordination
 Jeffrey Kent Ayeroff – art direction
 Mick Haggerty – art direction, design
 Herb Ritts – photography

Accolades

Grammy Awards 

|-
| width="35" align="center" rowspan="4"|1989 || Roll with It || Album of the Year || 
|-
|rowspan="2"| "Roll with It" || Record of the Year || 
|-
| Best Male Pop Vocal Performance || 
|-
| Tom Lord-Alge (engineer) ||  Best Engineered Album, Non Classical || 
|-

BRIT Awards 

|-
|  style="width:35px; text-align:center;" rowspan="2"|1989 || Roll with It || Best British Album || 
|-
| Steve Winwood  || Best British Male || 
|-

Charts

Weekly charts

Year-end charts

Certifications

References

Steve Winwood albums
1988 albums
Albums produced by Tom Lord-Alge
Virgin Records albums
Albums produced by Steve Winwood
Grammy Award for Best Engineered Album, Non-Classical